Division No. 9 may refer to:

 Division No. 9, Manitoba, census division in Manitoba
 Division No. 9, Alberta, census division in Alberta
 Division No. 9, Newfoundland and Labrador, census division in Newfoundland and Labrador
 Division No. 9, Saskatchewan, census division in Saskatchewan

See also
 Division No. 9 School
 9th Division (disambiguation)